Base oils are used to manufacture products including lubricating greases, motor oil and metal processing fluids. Different products require different compositions and properties in the oil. One of the most important factors is the liquid’s viscosity at various temperatures. Whether or not a crude oil is suitable to be made into a base oil is determined by the concentration of base oil molecules as well as how easily these can be extracted.

Base oil is produced by means of refining crude oil. This means that crude oil is heated in order that various distillates can be separated from one another. During the heating process, light and heavy hydrocarbons are separated – the light ones can be refined to make petrol and other fuels, while the heavier ones are suitable for bitumen and base oils.

There are large numbers of crude oils all around the world that are used to produce base oils. The most common one is a type of paraffinic crude oil, although there are also naphthenic crude oils that create products with better solubility and very good properties at low temperatures. By using hydrogenation technology, in which sulfur and aromatics are removed using hydrogen under high pressure, extremely pure base oils can be obtained, which are suitable when quality requirements are particularly stringent.
 
Chemical substances – additives – are added to the base oil in order to meet the quality requirements for the end products in terms of, for example, friction and cleaning properties. Certain types of motor oils contain more than twenty percent additives.

Official classifications
In 1993, the American Petroleum Institute (API), categorized base oils into five main groups. This breakdown is based on the refining method and the base oil’s properties in terms of, among other things, viscosity and the proportion of saturates and sulfur content.

Group I
Originating in the 1930s, the least refined type which is produced by Solvent Refining. It usually consists of conventional petroleum base oils. An improvement to the refining process in the 1960s called hydro-treating made this base oil more stable, less reactive, and longer lasting than the earlier base oils.

API defines group I as "base stocks contain less than 90 percent saturates and/or greater than 0.03 percent sulfur and have a viscosity index greater than or equal to 80 and less than 120".

Group II
Originating in 1971, a better grade of petroleum base oil, which may be partially produced by Hydrocracking. All impurities will be removed from the oil leading to clearer color.

API defines group II as "base stocks contain greater than or equal to 90 percent saturates and less than or equal to 0.03 percent sulfur and have a viscosity index greater than or equal to 80 and less than 120".

Group III
Originating in 1993, the best grade of petroleum base oil, since they are fully produced by Hydrocracking, Hydroisomerization, and Hydrotreating, which make these oils purer.

API defines group III as "base stocks contain greater than or equal to 90 percent saturates and less than or equal to 0.03 percent sulfur and have a viscosity index greater than or equal to 120".

This group may be described as Synthetic Technology oils or Hydro-Cracked Synthetic oil. However, some oil companies may call their products under this group as synthetic oil.

Group IV
Originating in 1974, consists of synthetic oils made of Poly-alpha-olefins (PAO). Group IV base oils have a viscosity index range of 125 - 200.

Poly-alpha-olefins (PAO) oils have a higher oxidative stability in extreme temperatures, and also have exceptionally low pour points, which makes them much more suitable for use in very cold weather (as found in northern Europe), as well as in very hot weather (as in Middle East).

Group V
Originating in the 1940s, any type of base oil other than mentioned in the previously defined groups.

They include, among others, naphthenic oils and polyesters.

Unofficial Classifications
Unofficial base oil classifications are not recognized by the American Petroleum Institute (API), however, they are widely used and marketed for motor oils and automatic transmission fluids.

Group II+
Originating in the 1990s, a more refined grade of petroleum Group III base oil, produced by Hydrotreating. Group II+ base oils have a high viscosity index at the higher end of the API Group II range. The viscosity index is 110-115 minimum.

Group III+
Originating in 2015, produced by a gas to liquids (GTL) process. Group III+ base oils have a Very High Viscosity Index (VHVI) at the higher end of the API Group III range. The viscosity index is 130-140 minimum.

Group VI
Consists of synthetic oils made of Poly-internal-olefins (PIO).

Poly-internal-olefins (PIO) oils are similar to Poly-alpha-olefins (PAO), but use different chemicals in the synthesis process to obtain an even higher viscosity index (VI)

References

External links
 A Review of Mineral and Synthetic Base Oils
 A Defining Moment for Synthetics

Petroleum products